Robert Blake (1772 – 25 March 1822) graduated from the Department of Physics at the University of Edinburgh, Scotland, in September 1798, having trained to be a dentist for his uncle, Edward Hudson.

Blake married Ann Higgins, daughter of the physician and chemist Dr. Bryan Higgins, on 25 November 1799, at St. James's Church, Piccadilly, London.

Blake was for many years Secretary to the Physico-Medical Society of Dublin. He was the first State Dentist of Dublin, and had a large dental practice in the city.

The Freeman's Journal reports Blake's death thus:

Published works
Blake's thesis, Disputatio medica inauguralis, de dentium formatione et structura in homine et in variis animalibus, was first published in Edinburgh in September, 1798. It was republished in Dublin in 1801 by William Porter, expanded and translated into English, under the title of An Essay on the Structure and Formation of the Teeth in Man and Various Animals. A revised and updated edition was published in 1851, featuring revisions and corrections, with notes by Cyreneus O. Cone.

In 1859, Nasmyth said of Blake's thesis:

Sources
Cameron, Sir Charles A; (1886). History of the Royal College of Surgeons in Ireland, and of the Irish Schools of Medicine. Fannin & Company, 41 Grafton Street, Dublin.
Nasmyth; (1859). Researches on the Development, Structure, and Diseases of the Teeth. Churchill, London.

References

Irish dentists
Scottish dentists
Alumni of the University of Edinburgh
1772 births
1822 deaths
Date of birth unknown
Place of birth unknown